José Arturo Álvarez Hernández (born June 28, 1985) is a former professional footballer who played as a winger and forward. Born in the United States, he represented the El Salvador national team.

Career

Professional
Álvarez did not play college soccer; instead, he joined MLS in 2003, signing a Project-40 contract, and was selected thirteenth overall in the 2003 MLS SuperDraft by the San Jose Earthquakes. In his first year, Álvarez scored his first MLS goal on June 14, 2003, against FC Dallas but would go on to get limited playing time. However, in January 2005 Álvarez was traded by San Jose with Richard Mulrooney and the #6 and #29 picks in the 2005 MLS SuperDraft to FC Dallas in exchange for Brad Davis, cash, and the #4 pick in the 2005 SuperDraft.

During the 2007 MLS Cup Playoffs, in the second leg of FC Dallas' Conference semifinal match with the Houston Dynamo, Álvarez was sent off for "violent conduct" after he kneed Brad Davis in the groin while out of bounds in the forty-seventh minute. Dallas went on to lose the tie 4–1, and the match 4–2 on aggregate.

Álvarez was traded to the new San Jose Earthquakes in July 2008 for allocation money and their first round draft pick in the 2009 MLS SuperDraft. In his debut, he scored the first goal of the match against the Los Angeles Galaxy in a match that ended 3–2. On November 24, 2010, Álvarez was selected in the tenth round of the 2010 MLS Expansion Draft by Portland Timbers but was immediately traded to Real Salt Lake for a 2nd round 2011 MLS SuperDraft pick.

The Salvadoran American made his debut with Real Salt Lake on March 15, 2011, when he entered in the 88th minuteof the first leg of the 2010–11 CONCACAF Champions League semifinals against Saprissa.

After the 2011 season, Real Salt Lake did not re-sign Álvarez. He opted to participate in the 2011 MLS Re-Entry Draft and was selected by Chivas USA on December 5, 2011. However, he instead signed a two-year contract with Portuguese first division club Paços de Ferreira. On March 18, 2012, he scored his first goal with his new team against Académica

On February 7, 2013, he was loaned to Hungarian club Videoton. He played well enough with the team that in June 2013 he signed a two-year contract to stay in Hungary. He was released in 2015.

On March 3, 2016, after a successful preseason trial with the club, Álvarez was signed by Chicago Fire to a one-year deal with one year option.

On December 10, 2017, Álvarez was traded by Chicago to his home town club, the Houston Dynamo, in exchange for a second-round selection in the 2019 MLS SuperDraft. Álvarez was mainly used as a sub and helped the Dynamo win the 2018 US Open Cup. He left the club again at the end of 2018.

On March 1, 2019, Álvarez announced his retirement from playing professional soccer.

International

United States
Álvarez represented the United States in various youth levels – U-17, U-18, and U-20. He also participated in various matches and training camps with the U-23 team.

El Salvador
Though Álvarez played on various United States national squads at the youth level, he was never called up to the senior national team. Being of Salvadoran descent, Álvarez was invited to play for the El Salvador national team by coach Carlos de los Cobos. On August 12, 2009, Álvarez made his debut for El Salvador in a World Cup qualifier against Trinidad and Tobago. On September 5, 2009, Álvarez started in a World Cup qualifier against his home country at Rio Tinto Stadium in Sandy, Utah. El Salvador fell, 2–1. On September 9, 2009, Álvarez played his first home game in Estadio Cuscatlán, in San Salvador, El Salvador against Costa Rica. El Salvador was victorious 1–0.

Career statistics

Club

International goals

Honors

Club
San Jose Earthquakes

 MLS Cup: 2003

Videoton
Nemzeti Bajnokság I: 2014–15
Houston Dynamo
US Open Cup: 2018

References

External links

 
 
 

1985 births
Living people
Soccer players from Houston
Salvadoran footballers
El Salvador international footballers
American soccer players
United States men's youth international soccer players
United States men's under-20 international soccer players
United States men's under-23 international soccer players
American sportspeople of Salvadoran descent
Salvadoran expatriate footballers
San Jose Earthquakes players
FC Dallas players
Real Salt Lake players
F.C. Paços de Ferreira players
Fehérvár FC players
Major League Soccer players
Primeira Liga players
Nemzeti Bajnokság I players
Citizens of El Salvador through descent
Expatriate footballers in Portugal
Expatriate footballers in Hungary
2011 Copa Centroamericana players
2011 CONCACAF Gold Cup players
2014 Copa Centroamericana players
2015 CONCACAF Gold Cup players
San Jose Earthquakes draft picks
Association football wingers
Houston Dynamo FC players
Chicago Fire FC players